Walter Frederick George Williams (8 October 1928 – 30 March 2018), better known by his stage name Bill Maynard, was an English comedian and actor. He began working in television in the 1950s, notably starring alongside Terry Scott in Great Scott - It's Maynard! (1955–56). In the 1970s and 1980s, he starred in the successful British sitcoms Oh No It's Selwyn Froggitt and The Gaffer and appeared in five films in the Carry On series. After a hiatus from television work in the late 1980s, Maynard starred as Claude Jeremiah Greengrass in the long-running television series Heartbeat from 1992 to 2000, reprising the character in the spin-off The Royal from 2002 to 2003.

Early life and career
Walter Williams began as a variety performer in the 1950s, under the stage name of Bill Maynard  the surname was inspired from seeing a billboard for the popular British confectionery, Maynard's Wine Gums, when he was to do performances for the BBC. Maynard's first television broadcast was on 12 September 1953 on Henry Hall’s Face the Music. For much of his career until the 1970s, his work was mostly towards performances: he entered and placed fourth in the British heat of the 1957 Eurovision Song Contest; he worked alongside  Terry Scott for the TV series Great Scott - It's Maynard!, after they worked together at Butlins Holiday Camp in Skegness; and he served as part of the news team on the One O'Clock Show for Tyne Tees Television in Newcastle (1959–64). He also served for BBC Radio Leicester during the 1960s, until his departure in 1968.

In 1971, Maynard entered into acting, securing a role on Dennis Potter's television play Paper Roses, which was about the last day in the life of a reporter, and then securing another role for Colin Welland's television play, Kisses at Fifty in 1973. Around the same year, he worked with television actor and comedian Ronnie Barker in the (original) "Football Blues", which aired as "Spanners Eleven", and was part of a series called Seven of One. In 1974, Maynard became a subject of This Is Your Life, when he was surprised by Eamonn Andrews. Around the same time, Maynard went to work for Yorkshire Television, starring in a pilot episode for a new sitcom. In 1975, he published his autobiography, The Yo-Yo Man, with Leicester's Golden Eagle books. Also in 1975 he appeared in The Sweeney episode Supersnout in which he played Detective Chief Inspector Stephen Quirk of the Metropolitan Police's Flying Squad being the subject of a conspiracy by Joey Stickley, a dirty and weasley informant who attempts to ruin his reputation. A year later Maynard took on the lead role in the sitcom Oh No It's Selwyn Froggitt between 1976 and 1978. In 1981, he starred in ITV sitcom The Gaffer, until its conclusion two years later in 1983.

During the 1970s, Maynard secured roles in a number of films: he starred in five of the Carry On films, including Carry On Matron (1972) and Carry On Dick (1974). He starred as Mr. Lea alongside Anthony Booth, Robin Askwith and Doris Hare in all four films in the Confessions series of sex comedies and appeared in the 1976 film It Shouldn't Happen to a Vet.

In April 1992, he returned to Yorkshire Television as lovable rogue Claude Jeremiah Greengrass in Heartbeat, a new ITV drama series set in the 1960s. It was a major success, consistently drawing over 10 million viewers. Maynard published a new book, Stand Up...And Be Counted, in 1997 with Breedon Books. He remained with Heartbeat until December 2000, when he was forced to retire from the programme following a series of strokes. Despite this, he returned to acting in 2002 to reprise his character in spin off series The Royal until 2003. Maynard made a comeback to radio in March of that year on BBC Radio Leicester. His programme Bill of Fare aired every Sunday afternoon from 2pm to 4pm for nearly five years, until he was dismissed without notice on 5 February 2008.

In October 2009, he made a return to the stage when he appeared as the main guest of honour at the Pride of Bridlington Awards held in the East Riding of Yorkshire. By then, his career slowly wound down due to his age and impaired mobility from his strokes, whereupon his final television appearance was made on 14 April 2018 for an episode of Pointless Celebrities; filming took place prior to his death, the episode aired two weeks after his funeral.

Personal life
Maynard was born in Farnham, Surrey, whereupon his family moved north to Leicestershire. He was educated at Kibworth Beauchamp Grammar School. Maynard lived in Sapcote, Leicestershire during the latter part of his life.

He married Muriel Linnett on 5 November 1949, and they had two children. She died in June 1983. Maynard was a vegetarian. His son is musician Martin Maynard Williams.

In March 1984, Maynard stood against Tony Benn in the by election at Chesterfield as an Independent Labour candidate. It was his sole foray into politics and was intended to prevent Benn returning to Parliament. Benn retained the seat; Maynard took fourth place.

On 4 September 1989, Maynard married Tonia Bern, widow of Donald Campbell, at Hinckley Registry Office. They divorced in 1998.

In later life, Maynard was mobility impaired, usually using a mobility scooter or wheelchair, having suffered from multiple strokes. He died in hospital on 30 March 2018, not long after falling and breaking his hip.

Filmography

Film

Television

Oh No It's Selwyn Froggitt (Television, 1974–1978) – Selwyn Froggitt
Father Brown: The Man With Two Beards (Television, 1974) - Mr. Carver
The Life of Riley (Television, 1975) – Frank Riley
The Sweeney "Supersnout" (Television, 1975) – Det. Chief Insp. Stephen Quirk
Paradise Island (Television, 1977) - Rev. Alexander Goodwin
Tales Of The Unexpected  (1980) - Merv Pottinger
The Gaffer (Television, 1981–1983) – Fred Moffatt
Minder "The Second Time Around" (Television, 1984) - Barney Todd
In Sickness and in Health (Television, 1985–1992) – Bert Luscombe
Screen One: Filipina Dreamgirls (Television, 1991) – George Trout
Heartbeat (Television, 1992–2000) (155 episodes) – Claude Jeremiah Greengrass
Dalziel and Pascoe "Dialogues of the Dead" (2002) – Councillor Cyril Steel
The Royal (Television, 2003) (seven episodes) – Claude Jeremiah Greengrass
The Moorside (2017) – Cecil

References

External links

Bill Maynard's "Stock Car Racing is Magic" lyrics
Bill Maynard's "Stock Car Racing is Magic" recording
 Bill Maynard (Aveleyman)

1928 births
2018 deaths
Accidental deaths from falls
English male film actors
English male soap opera actors
English radio personalities
Independent British political candidates
Male actors from Leicestershire
People from Farnham
People from Leicester